The 2012 Afghan Premier League is the first season of the Afghan Premier League, the Afghan league for association football clubs, since its establishment in 2012.

Teams
Eight teams competed in the league – four of which selected in a different group. All 8 teams are spread out across Afghanistan, but all the matches would be played at the Afghanistan Football Federation stadium in Kabul.

Note: Table lists in alphabetical order.

Clubs and locations

Group 1

League table

Matches

Group 2

League table

Matches

Finals series

Semi-finals

Final

Season statistics

Scoring

Top scorers

Own goals

References

Afghan Premier League seasons
1
Afghan
Afghan